Anton M. Storch, Anton M. Storch, for/also: Anton Michael Storch or Anton Maria Storch or Anton Monachus Storch or Anton Max Storch or Anton Martin Storch, (23 December 1813 – 31 December 1887) was an Austrian composer and choral director.

Life 
Born in Vienna, Storch received lessons from the music teacher Michael Eckel and studied at the Conservatory of the Society of Friends of Music (today University of Music and Performing Arts Vienna).

His son Anton Storch (25 December 1843 in Vienna – 19 April 1873 idem) followed in his father's footsteps as Kapellmeister  and composer.

M. Storch died in Vienna at the age of 74. His Ehrengrab (grave of honour) is located on the Vienna Central Cemetery (Group 0, row 1, number 11).

References

Further reading 
 Constantin von Wurzbach: Storch, A. M.. In Biographisches Lexikon des Kaiserthums Oesterreich. 39th part, Kaisetrlich-königliche Hof- und Staatsdruckerei, Vienna 1879,  Online 39 Biographisches Lexikon des Kaisertums Österreich.
 
 * Rudolf Flotzinger: Oesterreichisches Musiklexikon. Volume 5. publishing house of the Austrian Academy of Sciences, Vienna 2006, .

External links 
 

Austrian choral conductors
Austrian composers
1813 births
1887 deaths
Musicians from Vienna